Elmer Edwin Leifer (May 23, 1893 – September 26, 1948) was a pinch hitter in Major League Baseball. He played for the Chicago White Sox in 1921.

In 1922, while playing for the Little Rock Travelers of the Class-A Southern Association, Leifer was injured in a collision with teammate Travis Jackson, ending Leifer's playing career. Leifer continued to suffer from the effects of the collision in his later life. Leifer committed suicide by swallowing an overdose of Nembutal.

References

External links

1893 births
1948 suicides
Chicago White Sox players
Baseball players from Ohio
People from Monroe County, Ohio
Drug-related suicides in Washington (state)
Barbiturates-related deaths
Butte Miners players
Little Rock Travelers players
Moose Jaw Robin Hoods players
Minor league baseball managers
Oakland Oaks (baseball) players
Portland Beavers players